Hedbergia is a monotypic genus of flowering plants, initially classified in Scrophulariaceae, and now within the broomrape family Orobanchaceae. It contains a unique species, Hedbergia abyssinica. It is an afromontane genus, widespread in grasslands and scrubs of the mountains of tropical Africa, and known from Ethiopia, Zaire, Uganda, Kenya, Tanzania, Malawi, Nigeria, and Cameroons.

The genus name is a taxonomic patronym honoring the Swedish botanist Karl Olov Hedberg.

Description 

Phylogeny 
The phylogeny of the genera of Rhinantheae has been explored using molecular characters. Hedbergia belongs to the core Rhinantheae. Hedbergia is closely related to Odontites, Bellardia, and Tozzia. In turn, these genera share phylogenetic affinities with Euphrasia, and then with Bartsia.

References 

 
Orobanchaceae genera
Plants described in 1988
Parasitic plants